Acontia  or Acutia (Ἀκούτεια) was a town of the Vaccaei, in Hispania Tarraconensis, on the river Durius (the modern Douro), which had a ford here. Its site is unknown.

References

Populated places in Hispania Tarraconensis
Former populated places in Spain
Lost ancient cities and towns